Macroglossum fruhstorferi is a moth of the  family Sphingidae. It is known from the Obi Islands and Java.

It is similar to Macroglossum calescens. The underside of the palpus and middle of the thorax are blackish grey, speckled with white scales. The hindwing upperside has a yellow band, while the hindwing underside is yellowish in the basal area.

Subspecies
Macroglossum fruhstorferi fruhstorferi
Macroglossum fruhstorferi latifascia Rothschild & Jordan, 1903 (Obi Islands in Indonesia)

References

Macroglossum
Moths described in 1895